Evelyn is a rural locality in the Tablelands Region, Queensland, Australia.

History
The name Evelyn is taken from the name of an early pastoral run, which was named by Francis Horace Stubley (a Member of the Queensland Legislative Assembly in the Electoral district of Kennedy 1878-83), after his wife.

Evelyn Scrub Provisional School opened on 11 October 1895. On 1 January 1909, it became Evelyn Scrub State School. The school closed temporarily from 1918 to 1919. It closed permanently on 19 August 1946.

Heritage listings
Evelyn has a number of heritage-listed sites, including:
 Jonsson Road: Evelyn Scrub War Memorial
 off Jonsson Road: Cressbrook Cemetery

See also
 List of tramways in Queensland

References

Towns in Queensland
Tablelands Region
Localities in Queensland